59 may refer to: 
 59 (number)
 one of the years 59 BC, AD 59, 1959, 2059
 59 (album), by Puffy AmiYumi
 59 (golf), a round of 59 in golf
 "Fifty Nine", a song by Karma to Burn from the album Arch Stanton, 2014
 59 Skipton–Harrogate, a bus route in England